Walid Ghauri (born 12 May 1993) is a Norwegian cricketer who plays for the national team. In May 2019, he was named in Norway's squad for the Regional Finals of the 2018–19 ICC T20 World Cup Europe Qualifier tournament in Guernsey. He made his Twenty20 International (T20I) debut for Norway against Italy on 15 June 2019, and was named the man of the match.

References

External links
 

1993 births
Living people
Norwegian cricketers
Norway Twenty20 International cricketers
Place of birth missing (living people)